HMS Impulsive was an  built for the Royal Navy during the 1930s.  She saw service in World War II before being scrapped in 1946.  She has been the only ship of the Navy to bear this name.

Description
The I-class ships were improved versions of the preceding H-class. They were powered by two Parsons geared steam turbines, each driving one propeller shaft, using steam provided by three Admiralty three-drum boilers. Their crew numbered 145 officers and ratings.

The ships mounted four 4.7-inch (120 mm) Mark IX guns in single mounts, designated 'A', 'B', 'X' and 'Y' from bow to stern. For anti-aircraft (AA) defence, they had two quadruple mounts for the 0.5 inch Vickers Mark III machine gun. The I class was fitted with two above-water quintuple torpedo tube mounts for  torpedoes. One depth charge rack and two throwers were fitted; 16 depth charges were originally carried, but this increased to 35 shortly after the war began. Impulsive was one of the four I-class destroyers fitted with minelaying equipment in late 1938 – January 1939 at Malta. This consisted of mounts for rails on the deck on which to carry the mines and an electric winch to move the mines down the rails. A pair of sponsons were added to the stern to allow the mines to clear the propellers when dropped into the sea. 'A' and 'Y' guns and both sets of torpedo tubes were modified to allow them to be removed to compensate for the weight of the mines. The ships could carry a maximum of 72 mines. The I-class ships were fitted with the ASDIC sound detection system to locate submarines underwater.

Construction and career
Impulsive was laid down on 9 March 1936 by J. Samuel White and Company at their Cowes shipyard, launched on 1 March 1937 and completed on 29 January 1938. 28 and 29 May 1940 she made four trips to Dunkirk and rescued 2,919 troops. Following that, she participated in mine-laying duties and in the Arctic convoys. The destroyer's commander was William Scott Thomas, grandfather of actress Kristin Scott Thomas and the father of Admiral Sir Richard Thomas (a former Black Rod).

Impulsive was sold for scrap to W. H. Arnott, Young and Company, Limited on 22 January 1946 and broken up at Sunderland.

Notes

Bibliography
 
 
 
 
 
 
 
 
 
 
 
 

 

I-class destroyers of the Royal Navy
Ships built on the Isle of Wight
1937 ships
World War II destroyers of the United Kingdom